Paul Kent (born 29 March 1972 in Auckland) is a former breaststroke swimmer from New Zealand, who competed at the 1996 Summer Olympics in Atlanta, United States.

References
 Profile on NZ Olympic Committee
 

1972 births
Living people
Olympic swimmers of New Zealand
New Zealand male breaststroke swimmers
Swimmers at the 1996 Summer Olympics
Swimmers from Auckland
Medalists at the FINA World Swimming Championships (25 m)
20th-century New Zealand people
21st-century New Zealand people